Alte Brennerei Schwake  is a theatre in Ennigerloh, in the Münster region of North Rhine-Westphalia, Germany.

Theatres in North Rhine-Westphalia